Naning (Chinese: 南宁) is a district and a former chiefdom in northern Malacca, Malaysia.  It was founded in 1370 by the prince of Pagaruyung, Sutan Jatang Balun or known as Datuk Parpatih Nan Sebatang (The Only One Land Lord). It is part of Masjid Tanah constituency and is adjacent to Pulau Sebang.

Naning had been part of Negeri Sembilan but it was annexed by the British into Malacca in 1832 via the Naning War. Malacca at that time was a British holding.

The Naning-British War started in 1831 and lasted around two years until 1833. The Penghulu (chief/Lord) of Naning then, Dol Said was enraged over British claim over Naning as part of Malacca. The British demanded that Naning pay 10% of its produce as tribute to Malacca. Dol Said refused, resulting in a British attack upon Naning in 1831. Dol Said managed to fend off the attack with help from his allies. For the first time the British lost in a war in the Malay Peninsula. Towards the end of 1832, the British attacked Naning once again with a much larger force. Dol Said did not have the help of his allies this time. His army was defeated and he surrendered. He was offered a pension and a house in Malacca. 

Today, Naning is known as The District of Alor Gajah and is placed under the parliamentary constituency of Masjid Tanah, Alor Gajah and a small part at Jasin. Taboh Naning is within the municipal borders of Alor Gajah.

See also 
 Dol Said

References

1641 establishments in Asia
Geography of Malacca
1832 establishments in the British Empire